Taverne-Torricella railway station is a railway station in the Swiss canton of Ticino. The station is located on the border between the municipalities of Torricella-Taverne, Lamone and Bedano. The station is on the original line of the Swiss Federal Railways Gotthard railway between Bellinzona and Lugano. This line has been by-passed by the Ceneri Base Tunnel since 2020, and most trains between Lugano and Bellinzona now use the base tunnel rather than passing through Taverne-Torricella station.

The station is also the site of the junction for the freight-only branch to Lugano Vedeggio freight yard.

Services 
 the following services stop at Taverne-Torricella:

References

External links 
 
 

Railway stations in Ticino
Swiss Federal Railways stations